Frost Children is an American hyperpop duo from St. Louis, Missouri, now residing in New York City. The duo consists of siblings Angel and Lulu Prost.

History
The duo began their careers releasing a cover of Fall Out Boy's song "Yule Shoot Your Eye Out". In 2020, the duo released their first collection of songs, titled Aviation Creates Adventurous Beginnings. In 2021, the duo released an album titled Elixir Rejection. The duo released their latest album in 2022 titled Spiral. The album was recorded in upstate New York. The duo released a new song in January 2023 titled "Flatline". The duo announced their second full-length album, Speed Run, in 2023. The album will be released on April 14.

References

Musical groups from St. Louis